Barbara Potter and Sharon Walsh were the defending champions but lost in the semifinals to Claudia Kohde-Kilsch and Eva Pfaff.

Kohde-Kilsch and Pfaff won in the final 6–4, 4–6, 6–4 against Rosemary Casals and Wendy Turnbull.

Seeds
Champion seeds are indicated in bold text while text in italics indicates the round in which those seeds were eliminated.

 Kathy Jordan /  Anne Smith (first round)
 Barbara Potter /  Sharon Walsh (semifinals)
 Rosemary Casals /  Wendy Turnbull (final)
 Claudia Kohde-Kilsch /  Eva Pfaff (champions)

Draw

External links
 1983 Virginia Slims of California Doubles Draw

Silicon Valley Classic
1983 Virginia Slims World Championship Series